Canyon High School is a public high school located in New Braunfels, Texas, United States and classified as a 5A high school by the University Interscholastic League (UIL). It is part of Comal ISD and is one of the five high schools in the entire district. Canyon High School is zoned for students who live primarily in the southeastern Comal County area, including portions of New Braunfels as well as Garden Ridge, and portions of Schertz. In 2015, the school was rated "Met Standard" by the Texas Education Agency.

Athletics
The Canyon Cougars compete in the following sports:

 Band (Marching and Colorguard)
 Baseball
 Basketball
 Bowling
 Cross Country
 Football
 Golf
 Powerlifting
 Soccer
 Softball
 Swimming and Diving
 Tennis
 Track & Field
 Volleyball
 Wrestling
 Lacrosse

State Titles
Bowling
 Boys Varsity (2017) 
Softball - 
2009(4A)
Volleyball - 
1983(4A)
One Act Play - 
1964(2A)
Colorguard
Winter Guard State Championship (2015)

State Finalist  
Baseball - 
1985(4A)
Bowling
Boys Varsity (2003, 2004, 2005, 2007, 2008, 2012, 2013, 2014, 2015, 2016, 2017, 2018,2020)
Girls Varsity (2005, 2011, 2012, 2013, 2016, 2017,2019)
Volleyball - 
1986(4A), 1989(4A)
Academic Decathlon
1989, 1990

References

External links
 
 New Braunfels Canyon Athletics

High schools in Comal County, Texas
Public high schools in Texas
New Braunfels, Texas